Lorenzo Menakaya is a Nigerian on-air personality, actor, event host, filmmaker and singer. He received nominations for On-Air Personality (OAP) of the year at The Future Awards Africa (TFAA) 2011 and 2012; and he won the award of Outstanding Radio Presenter at the Nigerian Broadcasters Merit Awards 2016. He also hosted the Africa Movie Academy Awards, 2019.

Biography 
Born Tochukwu Lorenzo Uzonna Menakaya to the Menakaya dynasty of Umunya in Anambra State, Nigeria. He was educated at University of Nigeria Secondary School, Nsukka; Menakaya studied Religion at the University of Nigeria before receiving a short training in broadcasting by Institut Panos Afrique de l’Ouest (PANOS Institute West Africa), Dakar, Senegal and Institute for Media and Society, Lagos Nigeria. He recorded his first short film Sundown Tale in 2015 and in 2019, he produced his debut feature film Ordinary Fellows co-directing with Ikenna Aniekwe. In 2019, he was one of the hosts of the 15th Africa Movie Academy Awards along with actress Kemi Lala Akindoju and comedian Funnybone. He played the role of Ubong on Trace TV's Crazy, Lovely, Cool.

Awards

Filmography

Film

Television

Music videos

References 

Living people
Nigerian radio presenters
1986 births
Nigerian People's Party politicians
Nigerian radio personalities
Igbo actors
Actors from Anambra State
Nigerian television personalities
University of Nigeria alumni
21st-century Nigerian male actors